The sixth series of The Bill, a British television drama, consisted of 104 episodes, broadcast between 2 January – 27 December 1990. The series was first released on DVD as part of the Collection 5 and Collection 6 DVD boxsets in Australia, made available on 9 April – 8 October 2008, respectively. The series was later reissued as two-half series boxsets in Australia, released on 7 March 2012. The above artwork is taken from the most recent Australian release. It features images of DC Tosh Lines and DI Frank Burnside. The original Collection box-sets contained sole images of PC Reg Hollis and DS Ted Roach. In the UK, the first nine episodes were released on DVD under the title Volume 7, on 2 September 2013.

A number of Audio Commentaries for Series 6 episodes have been recorded with cast and crew, including stars Larry Dann (Sgt. Alec Peters), Chris Humphreys (P.C. Richard Turnham), Jon Iles (D.C. Mike Dashwood) and Lynne Miller (W.P.C. Cathy Marshall), writers Russell Lewis, Garry Lyons and J.C. Wilsher, camera operator Alison Chapman and producer Tony Virgo.

Cast changes

Arrivals
 Insp. Andrew Monroe (Episode 4-)
 DCI Gordon Wray (Episode 33-)
 PC Barry Stringer (Episode 41-)
 Det. Supt. Jack Meadows (Episode 45-)
 PC Steve Loxton (Episode 47-)
 PC Ron Smollett (Episode 50-)
 DAC Trevor Hicks (Episode 78-)
 WPC Delia French (Episode 79-)
 Sgt. Joseph Corrie (Episode 100-)
 DCI Kim Reid (Episode 102-)
 Sgt. John Maitland (Episode 103-)

Departures
 Insp. Christine Frazer - Took a leave of absence to write a thesis on women in the police
 PC Timothy Able - Unexplained
 PC Francis "Taffy" Edwards - Transferred to a Welsh police force
 PC Richard Turnham - Transferred to MS11
 PC Ken Melvin - Killed in the first Sun Hill station fire
 Sgt. Tom Penny - Resigned after being arrested for drink driving
 DCI Gordon Wray - Transferred after having an affair with WPC June Ackland

Episodes
{| class="wikitable plainrowheaders" style="width:100%; margin:auto; background:#FFFFFF;"
|-
! style="background-color:#EEEE00; width:20px;"|No. overall
! style="background-color:#EEEE00; width:20px;"|No. in series
! style="background-color:#EEEE00; width:150px;"|Title
! style="background-color:#EEEE00; width:230px;"|Episode notes
! style="background-color:#EEEE00; width:140px;"|Directed by
! style="background-color:#EEEE00; width:150px;"|Written by
! style="background-color:#EEEE00; width:100px;"|Original air date

|}

References

1990 British television seasons
The Bill series